SM Seaside, (formerly SM Seaside City Cebu) also known locally as Seaside, is a large shopping mall owned and developed by SM Prime Holdings in South Road Properties, Cebu City, Philippines. The mall opened on November 27, 2015, exactly 22 years after SM City Cebu, also owned by SM Prime, which opened in 1993.

, it is the largest mall in Cebu, the fourth largest shopping mall in the Philippines and the fourteenth in the world, with a gross floor area (GFA) of approximately 470,486 square meters. SM Seaside is SM Prime Holdings' third mall in Metro Cebu and its 56th mall in the Philippines. The mall is designed by Arquitectonica, the same company which designed other SM Supermalls, such as SM City North EDSA, SM Mall of Asia, and SM Megamall.

History 
On April 12, 2011, SM Prime Holdings held a ground-breaking ceremony at the mall's location.

SM Prime Holdings President Hans Sy said that the company has made adjustments to its destination mall project at SRP, in terms of budget allocation to ₱8.5 billion, from the original budget of ₱6 billion. The whole SM Seaside Complex costs ₱30 billion.

On November 27, 2015, SM Seaside opened and many shoppers flocked the mall, causing major traffic in the South Road Properties area. And during that night, a fireworks display was held to celebrate the opening of the large mall.

Features 

The SM Seaside is a circular-shaped retail mall with multiple anchors, including a two-story SM Store (formerly The SM Store), SM Supermarket, a Centerstage theater, a Large Screen format cinema, two Director's Club cinemas, and 4 regular cinemas, an 18-lane SM Bowling and Amusement Center, and an Olympic-size ice skating rink across the food court.

Large Screen Cinema 
The Large Screen Cinema features a super-sized screen almost 30% larger than the regular cinema screen size. This format uses the Christie 6P laser projection system and features a super-sized screen almost 30% larger than the regular cinema screen size. The Christie 6P laser produces the brightest images with 80% illumination and offers the best 3D platform that accurately reproduces the colors of the actual movie set, developing the most immersive cinema experience.  The SM Large Screen Cinema also proudly uses the Dolby Atmos Sound System and the top-of-the-line Christie Vive Speakers, its audience fully immersed in surround-sound technology. It will house 351 guests in stadium-like seats. The technology in this cinema is similar to Dolby Cinema, which also uses Christie projectors.

SMX Convention Center 
The proposed SMX Convention Center Cebu will stand on South Coast City.

Seaside Tower
This 147-meter tall tower is located on the center of the mall. There are plans for restaurants, coffee shops and a viewing deck at the top of the tower which will provide people with a 360-degree view of Cebu City and the mall. The tower is still currently unoccupied. The tower is supported by columns of 1500mm x 1500mm dimensions of 21 MPA concrete ultimate compression strength from the foundation up to the third level.

Other projects

SM Seaside Arena

The SM Seaside City Arena is a proposed 16,000-seating capacity indoor arena intended to be built across the shopping mall complex. It is planned to house international concerts and events, and, upon completion, will be the biggest indoor arena in Cebu.

It is planned to become a venue for the Cebu Schools Athletic Foundation, Inc. (CESAFI) and the Philippine Basketball Association (PBA) and was one of the planned venues for the 2019 FIBA Basketball World Cup, had the Philippines won its bid to host the tournament. 

In January 2017, SM Prime Holdings reportedly canceled its plans to build the arena. However, plans for the arena resumed in late 2019, with the arena, instead of being within the SM Seaside complex, now placed in the South Coast City, an adjacent mixed-use development co-owned by SM Prime with Ayala Land.

See also 
List of largest shopping malls in the world
List of largest shopping malls in the Philippines
List of shopping malls in the Philippines

References 

Shopping malls in Cebu City
Shopping malls established in 2015
SM Prime
Buildings and structures in Cebu City
Redeveloped ports and waterfronts in the Philippines